Nainana Jat is a census town in Agra district in the Indian state of Uttar Pradesh.

Demographics
Jats village.As of 2011 Indian Census, Nainana Jat had a total population of 12,941, of which 6,720 were males and 6,221 were females. Population within the age group of 0 to 6 years was 2,398. The total number of literates in Nainana Jat  was 5,801, which constituted 44.8% of the population with male literacy of 53.0% and female literacy of 36.0%. The effective literacy rate of 7+ population of Nainana Jat  was 55.0%, of which male literacy rate was 64.9% and female literacy rate was 44.3%. The Scheduled Castes and Scheduled Tribes population was 8,222 and 2 respectively. Nainana Jat  had 2172 households in 2011.

 India census, Nainana Jat had a population of 9,650. Males constitute 54% of the population and females 46%. Nainana Jat has an average literacy rate of 38%, lower than the national average of 59.5%: male literacy is 47%, and female literacy is 26%. In Nainana Jat, 23% of the population is under 6 years of age.
it is town of Jats.

References

Cities and towns in Agra district
Agra district